Arabis allionii is a species of flowering plant in the family Brassicaceae, native to the mountains of central and southern Europe and southern Turkey. The Royal Horticultural Society lists it as a garden plant for attracting pollinators, but gives its common name as "Siberian wallflower", suggesting that they have it confused with Erysimum × marshallii.

References

allionii
Flora of France
Flora of Central Europe
Flora of Italy
Flora of Yugoslavia
Flora of Albania
Flora of Bulgaria
Flora of Greece
Flora of Turkey
Plants described in 1805